The Ministry of Finance of the Russian Federation, also known as MinFin (Минфин России), is a ministry of the Government of Russia responsible for financial policy and general management in the field of finance.

The Ministry of Finance was formed from the Ministry of Finance of the USSR in 1992 and claims descent from the Ministry of Finance of the Russian Empire first established in 1780. It is headquartered at Ilinka Street 9 in Tverskoy District, Moscow.

Anton Siluanov has served as the Minister of Finance since September 2011.

History
The Treasury Governing body in Russia was established by Imperial Decree of Catherine II in October 24, 1780, as The Expedition of state revenues, which was, in fact, the beginning of the creation of state financial authority in Russia.

Manifesto of the Emperor Alexander I "On approval of the Ministries" was founded several ministries, including Ministry of Finance of the Russian Empire.

In the Soviet Union, the Ministry was renamed as the Ministry of Finance (MOF USSR), which combines the Treasury of the Soviet republics, in particular the Ministry of Finance of the RSFSR.

The Ministry of Finance of the Russian Soviet Federative Socialist Republic was part of the Council of Ministers of the RSFSR and was under the authority of the Soviet Ministry of Finance under The Council of Ministers of the USSR, the official name of the Soviet government.

By Decree of the President of the RSFSR from November 11, 1991 (Presidential Decree № 190) The Ministry of Finance was merged with the Ministry of Economy of and the new ministry was called the Ministry of Economy and Finance of the Russian Federative Republic. Under Resolution of the Government of the Russian Federative Soviet Republic (later the Government of Russia) from November 15, 1991 (Resolution № 8) the Ministry of Finance was liquidated and its businesses and organizations transferred to the Ministry of Economy and Finance of the Russian Soviet Federative Socialist Republic.

From December 25, 1991, to February 19, 1992, the Ministry was called Ministry of Economy and Finance. By Presidential Decree of February 19, 1992 № 156, it was again divided into two ministries - the Ministry of the Economy and Finance Ministry.

Because of the 2014 Crimean crisis, a number of Western countries aimed sanctions at Russia, with personal financial transactions by certain Russian individuals proscribed. Among these sanctioned individuals were Arkady Rotenberg and Boris Rotenberg, who also happened to be  shareholders of certain Russian banks.  On 24 March, MasterCard and Visa declined to permit transactions at these banks for a number of hours, ostensibly because they had misinterpreted the sanctions document.  Anton Siluanov, then-current Minister of Finance, told reporters on 26 March that he had revived plans to develop a Russian alternative card payment system to cut its dependence on Visa and MasterCard after these disruptions in their service. Siluanov said that "The payments restriction by Visa and Mastercard at one bank made us start thinking very seriously how we can secure ourselves against this kind of cases."  President Vladimir Putin agreed the next day in conference with legislators: "This wasn’t our decision.  We need to defend our interests. And we’ll do that.  It is really too bad that certain companies have decided on [...] restrictions.  I think this will simply cause them to lose certain segments of the market - a very profitable market."

Structure

Departments
Department of administration and control
Department of budgetary policy and methodology
Department of tax policy and customs schedule
Department of state debt and state financial assets
Department of financial policy
Department of regional budgets
Department of regulation of state financial control, auditing, accounting and records
Law Department
Department of budgetary policy in the sphere of military and law enforcement service and the state defense order
Administrative Department
Department of budgetary policy in the sphere of social welfare and science
Department of budgetary policy in the sphere of state management, judicial and public service
Department of development and execution of federal budget
Department of international financial relations
Department of information technologies in the sphere of budgeting and state and local finance management
Department of budgetary policy in the sphere of transport, roads, natural resources and agriculture
Department of budgetary policy in the sphere of innovation, civil industry, energetics, communication and public-private partnership

Subordinate authorities
 Federal Tax Service
 Federal Agency for State Property Management
 Federal Treasury
 Federal Customs Service
 Federal Service for Alcohol Market Regulation
 Gokhran
 Goznak

Russian Ministers of Finance

Further reading

English
 Steven Rosefielde, The Russian Economy: From Lenin to Putin, 2007, 260 p.
 Nihon Sōgō Kenkyūjo, The Russian economy: from stability to growth, Hoshino Committee on Economic Reform in Russia - 1996, 78 p.
 Robert C. Stuart, Paul R. Gregory, The Russian economy: past, present, and future - 1995, 146 p.
 Joseph R. Blasi, Maya Kroumova, Douglas Kruse, Kremlin capitalism: the privatization of the Russian economy - 1997, 249 p.
 Steve H. Hanke, Lars Jonung, Kurt Schuler, Russian currency and finance: a currency board approach to reform - 1993 - 222 p.
 David Stuart Lane, Russian banking: evolution, problems and prospects, 2002 - 268 p.

Russian
 Ivan Bloich / Блиох И. С. Финансы России XIX столетия (СПб., 1882)
 Вестник Финансов, Промышленности и Торговли (1894 г., № 5 и 8; 1895 г., № 7; 1896 г., № 21).
 Высшие и центральные государственные учреждения России, 1801—1917 гг. СПб., 2001. Т. 2.
 История Министерства финансов Российской Федерации. В 4 т. Т.1. 1903 - 1917. М., 2002.
 Министерство финансов //Экономическая история России с древнейших времен до 1917 г. Энциклопедия. Т.1. М.: РОСПЭН, 2008
 Соловьев Я.В. Министерство финансов Российской империи в 1858 - 1903 гг.: организация и функционирование. Диссертация на соискание ученой степени кандидата исторических наук. М., 2003.
 Соловьев Я.В. Министерство финансов Российской империи в начале царствования Александра II (1856 - 1862 годы)//Вестник Московского государственного областного университета. Серия «История и политические науки». 2004. №3.
 Соловьев Я.В. Бюрократический аппарат Министерства финансов в пореформенную эпоху //Вопросы истории. 2006. №7.
 Dmitry Tolstoi / Толстой Д. А., История финансовых учреждений со времени основания государства до кончины императрицы Екатерины II (СПб., 1848)
 Д. Н. Шилов, Государственные деятели Российской империи 1802—1917. С.-Петербург, 2002.
 Государственная власть СССР. Высшие органы власти и управления и их руководители. 1923—1991 гг. Москва, 1999.

References

External links

 
 Ministry of Finance of the Russian Federation
 Ministry of Finance of the Russian Federation 

Finance

Russia
Russia
Ministries established in 1780
Organizations based in Moscow
1780 establishments in the Russian Empire
Finance in Russia
Regulation in Russia
Russian entities subject to the U.S. Department of the Treasury sanctions